The Perth Cultural Centre is an area of central Perth, Western Australia, near the James Street Mall.

It is home to a number of cultural institutions including the Art Gallery of Western Australia, Western Australian Museum, State Library of Western Australia, State Records Office, State Theatre Centre of Western Australia, Perth Institute of Contemporary Arts, The Blue Room plus a number of coffee shops and bars.

The Perth Cultural Centre precinct is bound by Roe Street, Aberdeen Street, Beaufort Street and William Street in the suburb of Perth. A walkway  Gallery Walk, named to commemorate the 100th anniversary of the WA Art Gallery  connects the Cultural Centre to Perth railway station.

From 1 July 2018, the Perth Theatre Trust took over responsibility for the management and activation of the Perth Cultural Centre from the Metropolitan Redevelopment Authority.

Institutions

See also
Picabar, connected to the Perth Institute of Contemporary Arts

References

External links 

 

 
Buildings and structures in Perth, Western Australia
Tourist attractions in Perth, Western Australia
Culture in Perth, Western Australia
James Street, Northbridge